is a railway station in Oshamambe, Hokkaidō, Japan operated by the Hokkaido Railway Company (JR Hokkaido).

Lines
Futamata Station is served by the Hakodate Main Line. It is numbered S32.

Station layout
Futamata Station has a single side platform.

Platforms

Surroundings
  Route 5
 Futamata Radium Onsen
 Niseko Bus "Futamata Station" Bus Stop

Adjacent stations

References

Railway stations in Japan opened in 1903
Railway stations in Hokkaido Prefecture